Kajugaswatta is a village in Kalutara district in the western province of Sri Lanka.

It is located in 42 kilometers away from Colombo. Nearest towns are Horana and Bandaragama. Distance from both towns about 7 kilometers.
Divisional Secretariat is Millaniya.

References

Populated places in Kalutara District
Populated places in Sri Lanka